Hugh Virgil McDermott (November 19, 1893 – July 29, 1978) was the head basketball coach at the University of Oklahoma from 1922 to 1938. During his tenure, he compiled a record of 185-106. He also won the Missouri Valley Conference title and Big Eight Conference title.

Prior to his coaching days, McDermott was also a star player for the Oklahoma team while in college. He was the 1918 team captain. After resigning, McDermott took a job as head of the University's Physical Education Department.

Head coaching record

References

Oklahoma Sooners men's basketball players
Oklahoma Sooners men's basketball coaches
Oklahoma Sooners football players
College men's basketball head coaches in the United States
1893 births
1978 deaths